Thomas Jeffery may refer to:

 Thomas B. Jeffery (1845–1910), American inventor and manufacturer of bicycles and early automobiles
 Thomas Nickleson Jeffery (1782–1847), colonial official and politician in Nova Scotia
 Tom Jeffery (born 1953), British civil servant
 Thomas E. Jeffrey (born 1947), historian at Rutgers University